Jane Hall is a six-part British television comedy drama on ITV, written by Sally Wainwright and starring Sarah Smart, Stephen Mangan, Daniel Lapaine, Geraldine James, Nitin Ganatra, Gillian Taylforth, Ian Reddington, Ann Mitchell, Robert Glenister and Suzanna Hamilton. It revolves around Jane Hall's job training to be a bus driver and her home life in Hounslow, "the arsehole of London".

The series was originally to be titled Jane Hall's Big Bad Bus Ride, but was renamed Jane Hall. It first aired in New Zealand in April 2006 on TV One (under the original title) achieving good viewing figures. It is produced by the independent Red Production Company, and was produced some two years before it eventually received its first UK broadcast in the summer of 2006.

It was reported in September 2006 that no further episodes would be commissioned.

Buses 

The buses used in the series were painted in the London United livery. Jane Hall was a driver at Hounslow bus depot in west London. Shots of the outside of the depot appear in the series. Buses included the following types: Leyland Olympian, Volvo Citybus and an East Lancs Greenway rebuild of a Leyland National. In the final episode when Jane returns home to Huddersfield, there is a Mercedes-Benz Vario minibus in Stagecoach Group livery with vinyls covering the Stagecoach names. This pre-empts the real-life sale of Stagecoach Yorkshire's Huddersfield operations to Centrebus. Some of the acquired buses ran in Huddersfield Bus Company service still in Stagecoach livery.

References

External links

2006 British television series debuts
2006 British television series endings
2000s British comedy-drama television series
ITV television dramas
Television series by Red Production Company
Television series created by Sally Wainwright
2000s British television miniseries
English-language television shows
Television shows set in the United Kingdom
Buses in fiction